The Pine Island Van Horn Public Library is a library in Pine Island, Minnesota. It is a member of Southeastern Libraries Cooperating, the Southeast Minnesota library region. The library holds both annual and temporary events, which are sometimes seasonal in nature, for both children and adults. An annual book sale and children's summer reading program are longtime programs employed at Van Horn. A cart containing books sold to support the library runs continuously.

History 
The current facility for the Van Horn Library was funded by a generous estate gift by Frank A. Van Horn, after whom the library is named. Eight thousand dollars was specifically set aside for a library, of which 3/4ths was allotted for construction and the remaining reserved for materials. His entire estate was left for the town and he entrusted his close friend George B. Doty to oversee the responsibility. A plaque was built into the library to commemorate this contribution, and it was intended to open on January 1, 1918, but construction was not completed in time. High school students assisted in building in order to speed its completion. It opened to the public on January 24, 1918. The original rules stated a fine of 2 cents per day a book was overdue, a maximum of two books checked out per person (of which only one could be fiction), and a maximum period of two weeks to return books, a practice which the library still follows today.

In November 1990, a push to move the library to a potential space expansion of the local elementary school was unsuccessful. Supporters of the move expressed a need for a new facility and fears that funding would not be available without the move for the Americans with Disabilities Act modifications to be enforced in 1995. Opponents, organized under the name "Friends of the Van Horn Library", cited concerns of losing a historical landmark within the community, restrictions of books, limited access by community members, and loss of SELCO membership, an important resource to the library. Supporters of the library from both sides rallied behind the slogan "Viva Van Horn". In 1994, only $70,000 of the library-estimated 90,000 dollars needed to install a handicapped-friendly elevator was pledged, and community efforts such as money pledging for miles traveled on the Douglas Trail and public auctions made up the difference to make the library accessible to all patrons.

A mural featuring community-selected classic book scenes was painted by Greg Preslicka in 2010, funded by a shared grant between Van Horn and the Zumbrota Public Library for the Library Legacy Project. In July 2012, a new copy machine, capable of scanning, color printing/copying, and faxing, was purchased and operational for patrons. In August 2014, an individual donated a Kindle Fire e-reader to the library for public use. The library received a grant and subsequently digitized editions of a former local paper from 1882 to 1922 in 2015, which were made available online at the Minnesota Digital Newspaper Hub.

Current Facility and Programs 
The building consists of two floors, with a children-focused section as the ground floor and an adult-focused section above. The Van Horn Public Library has been known to collaborate with the nearby Zumbrota Public Library on programs such as the summer reading program, the independently owned Better Brew Coffeehouse, the Pine Haven Community, a local retirement home, and the organization Pine Island People for the Arts (PAPA) for various programs and events, as well as other local businesses and organizations. The facility maintains a straw bale garden with the help of child patrons. The library delivers large-print books to the Pine Haven Community bimonthly as a free service for the residents. A staff member published a children's book based upon her late husband's hunting memories titled "Feed the Mice: Woodsy Tales in Memory of Opa" and was actively promoted after release in 2011 at the library. A fireplace built into the top level is no longer in use. Subscriptions to several area and national newspapers are available to browse as well as magazine subscriptions. The library also provides facilities for the local festival Winterfest. A Little Free Library is slated to open June 5 which will be owned by the library.

Petition 
The library has pursued funding from the mayor and City Council of Pine Island for a larger facility due to alleged concerns regarding space. In 2012, a needs assessment was conducted on the current facility, and inadequacies such as lack of space for events, study, and storage, lack of proper staff work area, and not enough computer stations for flow of patrons were highlighted by community members. A Change.org petition, created by the library, was provided a link on the official Van Horn website. A goal of 500 signatures, roughly 1/3 of the population of the town, was promoted in order to show adequate support, and on October 20, 2012, the Van Horn Library Board requested two suggestion boxes be placed in Pine Island to gauge support for a new library facility, which was approved. On August 5, 2015 the Van Horn Public Library began to actively promote the online petition on its Facebook page. As of 2019 the petition has been closed and is no longer mentioned on the official website.

References

External links 
 Online Library Catalog at SELCO
 Pine Island Van Horn Public Library website

Southeastern Libraries Cooperating
Buildings and structures in Goodhue County, Minnesota
Education in Goodhue County, Minnesota